Nilson Esidio Mora, (born 19 November 1965 in Santa Rita do Passa Quatro, São Paulo) is a Brazilian former professional footballer who played as a forward. In 1993, he played 34 games and scored 25 goals for Flamengo.

During his playing career, Nílson made 110 appearances and scored 44 goals in the Campeonato Brasileiro.

Honours
Internacional
Rio Grande do Sul State Championship: 1990

Individual
Primera División Peruana top scorer: 1998

References

1965 births
Living people
People from Santa Rita do Passa Quatro
Brazilian footballers
Footballers from São Paulo (state)
Association football forwards
Campeonato Brasileiro Série A players
Peruvian Primera División players
La Liga players
Esporte Clube XV de Novembro (Jaú) players
Club Athletico Paranaense players
CR Flamengo footballers
Fluminense FC players
Grêmio Foot-Ball Porto Alegrense players
Sport Club Internacional players
Albacete Balompié players
RC Celta de Vigo players
Real Valladolid players
Associação Atlética Ponte Preta players
Sociedade Esportiva Palmeiras players
Sporting Cristal footballers
Club Universitario de Deportes footballers
CR Vasco da Gama players
Tigres UANL footballers
Associação Atlética Flamengo players
Brazilian expatriate footballers
Brazilian expatriate sportspeople in Peru
Expatriate footballers in Peru
Brazilian expatriate sportspeople in Spain
Expatriate footballers in Spain
Brazilian expatriate sportspeople in Mexico
Expatriate footballers in Mexico